Daniel James Lauzon (born March 30, 1988) is a former American mixed martial artist who competed in the World Series of Fighting's Lightweight division, and has also formerly competed in the UFC and Affliction. He is the younger brother of fellow MMA fighter Joe Lauzon.

Mixed martial arts career

Ultimate Fighting Championship
Lauzon began training at the age of 14. He made his Ultimate Fighting Championship (UFC) debut at UFC 64: Unstoppable, losing to Spencer Fisher. At 18 years, seven months and 14 days old, Lauzon was the second youngest fighter ever to appear in the UFC.

Lauzon is sponsored by TapouT and appeared in an episode of the television series TapouT. The TapouT crew followed Lauzon through the final preparations for his fight with Frank Latina. While filming, the crew expressed doubts about Lauzon's trainer and introduced him to crosstown rival trainer Mark DellaGrotte. After the episode aired, Lauzon's brother Joe criticized the episode and the TapouT crew's actions.

Affliction
Lauzon was originally scheduled to fight Chris Horodecki at the Affliction: Day of Reckoning event on January 24, but Chris was denied his license for failing his physical. Bobby Green stepped up to take Horodecki's spot against Lauzon. During the fight against Green, Lauzon claimed he was kicked and kneed to the groin a total of three times, a fact openly questioned by bloggers, internet forums and live by the broadcast team. Tito Ortiz was the color commentator for the event and, at one point, stated "Dan is faking". Referee Herb Dean and the ringside doctor asked Dan Lauzon if he wanted to continue to fight, and the fight was eventually restarted with Bobby Green having 2 points deducted. The crowd loudly booed the point deduction. While Bobby Green's unorthodox style managed to give Dan difficulties on the feet, Lauzon manage to control the fight on the ground and won due to a rear-naked choke with five seconds left in the first round.

Return to Ultimate Fighting Championship
With the demise of the Affliction fight organization, Dan became a free agent and as of July 28, 2009, was under contract with the UFC.

Dan Lauzon faced Cole Miller on January 2, 2010 at UFC 108. In a back-and-forth fight, Miller locked a kimura from an inverted triangle position, earning himself a $50,000 Submission of the Night bonus. At the same event, Dan's brother, Joe Lauzon also lost his fight. After the event, Joe Lauzon said that a fight between them, or even at the same event, is "not an option anymore".

Two weeks before his scheduled fight in UFC 114, Dan Lauzon told the Boston Herald that his coaches and his brother Joe Lauzon would not "be there to support me." Reportedly unsatisfied with Lauzon's commitment to training, his coaches gave him an ultimatum requiring that he follow the schedule laid out for him, otherwise they would not corner him for his fight. Joe Lauzon claimed they had clearly outlined what was expected and his brother had fallen short. Escudero defeated Lauzon via unanimous decision.

In the aftermath off his loss at UFC 114, Lauzon was released from the promotion.

Post-UFC
After the loss, Lauzon was invited to train with Renzo Gracie and planned on taking Gracie up on his offer. 

Lauzon made his first post-UFC fight against John Ortolani which he won via KO (punches) in the 2nd round. His next fight came exactly 2 months later against Damien Trites, which he won again by guillotine choke in the 1st round.

On February 17, 2011, Lauzon was stabbed outside a nightclub in Bridgewater, Massachusetts, sustaining non life-threatening injuries. According to Lauzon he did not reveal the identity of the attacker to the police.

On June 18, 2011, Lauzon returned to action fighting in the main event for World Championship Fighting against Noah Weisman for the Lightweight belt. Lauzon dominated the stand-up and won by KO in the 1st round to become the Lightweight Champion of World Championship Fighting.

On December 3, 2011, Lauzon defeated Anthony Kaponis via KO (punches) at 1:42 of round 1 in the main event of Premier FC 7. He has now won 5 straight fights since being released from the UFC, finishing 4 of his 5 opponents.

World Series of Fighting
Lauzon made his World Series of Fighting debut against UFC vet John Gunderson at WSOF 3 on June 14, 2013 headlined by former UFC vets Josh Burkman and Jon Fitch. He won the fight via unanimous decision. At that point, he was riding a five-fight win streak.

Lauzon faced undefeated prospect Justin Gaethje at WSOF 6. He lost the fight via TKO in the second round.

Mixed martial arts record

|-
| Loss
| align=center| 17–6
| Chip Moraza-Pollard
| TKO (head kick and punches)
| CES MMA 30: Felix vs. Lane
| August 14, 2015
| align=center| 2
| align=center| 3:12
| Lincoln, Rhode Island, United States
|
|-
| Loss
| align=center| 17–5
| Justin Gaethje
| KO (punches)
| World Series of Fighting 6
| October 26, 2013
| align=center| 2
| align=center| 1:40
| Coral Gables, Florida, United States
|
|-
| Win
| align=center| 17–4
| John Gunderson 
| Decision (unanimous) 
| World Series of Fighting 3
| 
| align=center| 3
| align=center| 5:00
| Las Vegas, Nevada, United States
| 
|-
| Win
| align=center| 16–4
| Anthony Kaponis
| KO (punches)
| Premier FC 7
| 
| align=center| 1
| align=center| 1:42
| Amherst, Massachusetts, United States
| 
|-
| Win
| align=center| 15–4
| Noah Weisman
| TKO (punches)
| WCF 11
| 
| align=center| 1
| align=center| 3:56
| Wilmington, Massachusetts, United States
| 
|-
| Win
| align=center| 14–4
| Damien Trites
| Submission (guillotine choke)
| CES: Snow Brawl
| 
| align=center| 1
| align=center| 1:54
| Lincoln, Rhode Island, United States
| 
|-
| Win
| align=center| 13–4
| John Ortolani
| TKO (punches)
| Triumph Fighter 4: Hostile
| 
| align=center| 2
| align=center| 2:22
| Milford, New Hampshire, United States
| 
|-
| Loss
| align=center| 12–4
| Efrain Escudero
| Decision (unanimous)
| UFC 114
| 
| align=center| 3
| align=center| 5:00
| Las Vegas, Nevada, United States
| 
|-
| Loss
| align=center| 12–3
| Cole Miller
| Submission (modified kimura) 
| UFC 108
| 
| align=center| 1
| align=center| 3:05
| Las Vegas, Nevada, United States
| 
|-
| Win
| align=center| 12–2
| Bobby Green
| Submission (rear-naked choke)
| Affliction: Day of Reckoning
| 
| align=center| 1
| align=center| 4:55
| Anaheim, California, United States
| 
|-
| Win
| align=center| 11–2
| Justin Hammertrum
| TKO (punches) 
| World Championship Fighting 5
| 
| align=center| 1
| align=center| 0:45
| Wilmington, Massachusetts, United States
| 
|-
| Win
| align=center| 10–2
| Brendan Hoxie
| TKO (punches) 
| World Championship Fighting 4
| 
| align=center| 2
| align=center| 3:45
| Wilmington, Massachusetts, United States
| 
|-
| Win
| align=center| 9–2
| Frank Latina
| Submission (triangle choke)
| World Championship Fighting 3
| 
| align=center| 1
| align=center| 3:10
| Wilmington, Massachusetts, United States
| 
|-
| Win
| align=center| 8–2
| Andrew Montanez
| TKO (punches) 
| Wild Bill's Fight Night 13
| 
| align=center| 1
| align=center| 1:48
| Atlanta, Georgia, United States
| 
|-
| Win
| align=center| 7–2
| David George
| TKO (punches) 
| Combat Zone 24 
| 
| align=center| 1
| align=center| 2:46
| Revere, Massachusetts, United States
| 
|-
| Win
| align=center| 6–2
| Wayne Harnois
| KO (punches)
| World Championship Fighting 1
| 
| align=center| 1
| align=center| 0:14
| Wilmington, Massachusetts, United States
| 
|-
| Win
| align=center| 5–2
| James Meal
| TKO (punches) 
| FFP Untamed 14 
| 
| align=center| 2
| align=center| 3:57
| Plymouth, Massachusetts, United States
| 
|-
| Loss
| align=center| 4–2
| Deividas Taurosevicius
| Submission (rear-naked choke)
| CFFC 3: Battleground
| 
| align=center| 2
| align=center| 1:15
| Atlantic City, New Jersey, United States
| 
|-
| Loss
| align=center| 4–1
| Spencer Fisher
| TKO (punches)
| UFC 64: Unstoppable
| 
| align=center| 1
| align=center| 4:38
| Las Vegas, Nevada, United States
| 
|-
| Win
| align=center| 4–0
| Dyrell Walker
| Submission (triangle choke)
| CZ 17: Take Control 
| 
| align=center| 1
| align=center| 3:52
| Revere, Massachusetts, United States
| 
|-
| Win
| align=center| 3–0
| Leonard Wilson
| Submission (choke)
| RITC 84: Celebrity Theatre 
| 
| align=center| 2
| align=center| 1:34
| Phoenix, Arizona, United States
| 
|-
| Win
| align=center| 2–0
| Jason Harris
| Submission (choke)
| RITC 83: Rampage
| 
| align=center| 1
| align=center| N/A
| Scottsdale, Arizona, United States
| 
|-
| Win
| align=center| 1–0
| Anthony Peters
| Submission (toe hold)
| WFL 6: Real - No Fooling Around 
| 
| align=center| 2
| align=center| 2:20
| Revere, Massachusetts, United States
|

See also
 List of male mixed martial artists

References

External links
 
 
 MMATorch Interview
 The NHB Show Interview

American male mixed martial artists
Mixed martial artists from Massachusetts
Lightweight mixed martial artists
Mixed martial artists utilizing wrestling
Mixed martial artists utilizing boxing
Mixed martial artists utilizing Brazilian jiu-jitsu
1988 births
Sportspeople from Brockton, Massachusetts
Living people
People from East Bridgewater, Massachusetts
Sportspeople from Plymouth County, Massachusetts
Ultimate Fighting Championship male fighters
American practitioners of Brazilian jiu-jitsu